The 1935 Central State Bearcats football team represented Central State Teachers College, later renamed Central Michigan University, as an independent during the 1935 college football season. In their second season under head coach Alex Yunevich, the Bearcats compiled a 1–6 record and were outscored by their opponents by a combined total of 101 to 32. The team's only win was by a 19–0 score over Assumption College from Windsor, Ontario. The worst defeat was by a 43–0 score against Gus Dorais' 1935 Detroit Titans football team

Schedule

References

Central State
Central Michigan Chippewas football seasons
Central State Bearcats football